Meenakshisundaram Ramasamy Viswanathan (1 July 1945  –  22 March 2020), best known by his stage name Visu or Arai Trouser, was an Indian writer, director, stage, film and television actor and talk-show host. Visu initially worked as an assistant to director K. Balachander until becoming a director himself. He later began acting, with his first film being Kudumbam Oru Kadambam (1981), directed by S. P. Muthuraman.

Career

He started his career as a theatre artist, working with Y. G. Parthasarathy's drama troupe. He was writing scripts for stage dramas before getting into the film industry as an assistant to legendary director K. Balachander. During his time with Balachander, he wrote screenplays for numerous films including Pattina Pravesam (1977), Avan Aval Adhu (1980), Thillu Mullu (1981) and Netrikkan (1981). Thillu Mullu and Netrikkan, which were both released in 1981, became box office hits for actor Rajinikanth.Visu made his debut as an actor in the film Kudumbam Oru Kadambam (1981), for which he also wrote the screenplay. The film was directed by S. P. Muthuraman. 

His first film as a director was Kanmani Poonga (1982). Most of his films including Manal Kayiru (1982), Dowry Kalyanam (1983), Samsaram Adhu Minsaram (1986), Thirumathi Oru Vegumathi (1987), Penmani Aval Kanmani (1988), Vedikkai En Vadikkai (1990) and Pattukottai Periyappa (1994) spoke about the issues of urban middle-class families. These films, which were released in the mid-80s, turned out to be crowd pullers, particularly with regard to the female audience. His other super hit was Chidambara Rahasiyam (1985), which is considered a cult-classic.

While he has directed a rage of actors on screen, he and his brother Kishmu used to star in his films as well in memorable roles. His film Neenga Nalla Irukkanum won the National Film Award for Best Film on Other Social Issues in 1992. Based on prohibition, the film was the last onscreen appearance of then chief minister, J. Jayalalithaa.

He has also shared the screen with Rajinikanth in Nallavanukku Nallavan (1984), Mr. Bharath (1986), Mannan (1992), Uzhaippali (1993) and Arunachalam (1997).

During the ending phase of his career, he made movies which did not leave a lasting mark on the audience as Vaa Magale Vaa (1994), Meendum Savithri (1996) and Sigamani Ramamani (2001).

Actor and stage artiste S. Ve. Shekher, who has worked in over 20 films with Visu, said that he was an extremely disciplined and committed.
 
As an actor, he was last seen in Manal Kayiru 2 (2016), the sequel to one of his earliest directorial successes, Manal Kayiru.

He is known to have starred in over 60 films and directed around 25 films.

Style 

In most of the films he directed there is a character named Uma, named after a school teacher who predicted his rise to fame after reading one of his scripts when he was a travel agent.

Other works
He became known for hosting live debates on television, namely  Arattai Arangam on Sun TV and Visuvin Makkal Arangam on Jaya TV. He joined and campaigned for BJP.

Final years and Death

On 22 March 2020 at Chennai, Visu died of kidney failure at the age of 74.

Filmography 

Films

Television
Arattai Arangam - Sun TV
Makkal Arangam - Jaya TV
Naalavathu Mudichu - Jaya TV

References

External links 
 

1945 births
2020 deaths
20th-century Indian dramatists and playwrights
20th-century Indian film directors
20th-century Indian male actors
20th-century Indian male writers
21st-century Indian dramatists and playwrights
21st-century Indian film directors
21st-century Indian male actors
21st-century Indian male writers
Deaths from kidney failure
Directors who won the Best Film on Other Social Issues National Film Award
Directors who won the Best Popular Film Providing Wholesome Entertainment National Film Award
Film directors from Tamil Nadu
Indian film directors
Indian male dramatists and playwrights
Indian male film actors
Male actors in Tamil cinema
Screenwriters from Tamil Nadu
Tamil dramatists and playwrights
Tamil film directors
Tamil male actors
Television personalities from Tamil Nadu
Tamil screenwriters